Taconic Vocational High School is a vocational high school in Pittsfield, Massachusetts, United States. Taconic was built in 1968 and opened in 1969, which serves as a high school of choice for students in Pittsfield. The school's primary focus is on vocational training and it offers such courses as auto mechanics, printing, drafting, electronics, carpentry, and others. In May 2016, J. H. Maxymillian Inc. broke ground on a $120.8 million plan to construct a new Taconic High School at the same location. The new building was completed in time for the start of the 2018 school year and the old school was demolished upon completion of the new one. An expanded parking lot and soccer field were built where the old school stood in 2019. The new building covers 246,520 square feet. Along with Pittsfield High School, it is one of two high schools in the Pittsfield Public School system. In March 2022, the Taconic Braves were renamed as the Thunder.

References 

Public high schools in Massachusetts
Schools in Berkshire County, Massachusetts
Buildings and structures in Pittsfield, Massachusetts
Educational institutions established in 1968
1968 establishments in Massachusetts